Aroi may refer to:

 Aroi, Patras, Greek neighborhood in Patras
 Kenas Aroi (1942-1991), Nauruan politician, President of Nauru in 1989
 Millicent Aroi, Nauruan diplomat